Melodinus is a genus of plant in the family Apocynaceae, first described as a genus in 1776. It is native to Indomalaya, Meganesia and various islands in the western Pacific. A type of monoterpenoid indole alkaloids called melodinines can be isolated from Melodinus plants.

Species
Accepted species include:

 Melodinus acutiflorus F. Muell. - Papua New Guinea, Queensland, New South Wales 
 Melodinus aeneus Baill. - New Caledonia 
 Melodinus angustifolius Hayata - Taiwan, N Vietnam 
 Melodinus australis (F. Muell.) Pierre - New Guinea, Queensland, New South Wales, Northern Territory, Solomon Islands, Bismarck Archipelago, Vanuatu 
 Melodinus axillaris W. T. Wang - Yunnan
 Melodinus balansae Baill. - New Caledonia
 Melodinus baueri Endl. - E Kalimantan, Papua New Guinea, Norfolk Island
 Melodinus cochinchinensis (Lour.) Merr. - Indochina, W Malaysia, E Himalayas (Assam, Bhutan, Bangladesh, etc.), Yunnan
 Melodinus cumingii A. DC. - Philippines
 Melodinus densistriatus Markgr. - New Guinea
 Melodinus forbesii Fawc.  - Bali, Lombok, Timor, Flores, Maluku, Sulawesi, New Guinea
 Melodinus fusiformis Champ. ex Benth.  - China (Guangdong, Guangxi, Guizhou), Indochina, Luzon
 Melodinus glaber Turrill - Vanuatu, Fiji
 Melodinus honbaensis A. Chev. ex Pit. - S Vietnam
 Melodinus insularis (Markgr.) Fosberg - Palau
 Melodinus orientalis Blume  - Thailand, W Malaysia, Borneo, Java, Lesser Sunda Islands, Sumatra, Sulawesi, Philippines 
 Melodinus philippensis A.DC. - Mindoro
 Melodinus philliraeoides Labill.  - New Caledonia
 Melodinus reticulatus Boiteau - New Caledonia
 Melodinus scandens J. R. Forst & G. Forst. - New Caledonia
 Melodinus suaveolens (Hance) Champ. ex Benth. - Guangdong, Hong Kong, Hainan, Guangxi, Vietnam 
 Melodinus tenuicaudatus Tsiang & P. T. Li - Yunnan, Guizhou, Guangxi
 Melodinus vitiensis Rolfe - Loyalty Islands, Fiji, Tonga, Samoa, Vanuatu

References

 
Apocynaceae genera
Taxonomy articles created by Polbot